Crack House is a 1989 American crime film directed by Michael Fischa and written by Blake Schaeffer. The film stars Jim Brown, Anthony Geary, Richard Roundtree, Cher Butler, Angel Tompkins, Clyde Jones, Albert Michel Jr. and Heidi Thomas. The film was released on November 10, 1989, by Cannon Film Distributors.

Cast
 Jim Brown as Steadman
 Anthony Geary as Dockett
 Richard Roundtree as Lieutenant Johnson
 Cher Butler as Melissa 
 Angel Tompkins as Mother
 Clyde Jones as B.T.
 Albert Michel Jr. as Chico
 Heidi Thomas as Annie
 Kenny Edwards as Tripper
 Joey Green as "Buzz"
 Jon Greene as Officer Baylor
 T. Rodgers as "Jammer"
 Louis Rivera as Jesus
 Willie Hernandez as Lou
 Gregg Thomsen as Ricardo "Rick" Morales 
 Jacob Vargas as Danny
 Michael Matthews as Teddy
 Derek Googe as David

Reception
The film grossed $210,162 in its opening weekend.

References

External links 
 
 

1989 films
American crime films
1980s crime films
Golan-Globus films
Hood films
Films directed by Michael Fischa
1980s English-language films
1980s American films